Joseph Mack ( Maciarz, January 4, 1912 – December 19, 1998) was a Major League Baseball first baseman who played for the Boston Braves in 1945.  The 33-year-old rookie was a native of Chicago.

Mack is one of many ballplayers who only appeared in the major leagues during World War II.  He made his major league debut on April 17, 1945 (Opening Day) against the New York Giants at Braves Field.  He was Boston's regular first baseman until the July 4, when he played in his last big league game.

Season and career totals include 66 games played, a .231 batting average (60-for-260), 3 home runs, 44 runs batted in, and 30 runs scored.  He made 6 errors in 65 games at first base and had a fielding percentage of .991.

External links

1912 births
1998 deaths
Baseball players from Illinois
Birmingham Barons players
Boston Braves players
Chattanooga Lookouts players
Columbus Red Birds players
El Dorado Lions players
Houston Buffaloes players
Indianapolis Indians players
Little Rock Travelers players
Macon Peaches players
Major League Baseball first basemen
Milwaukee Brewers (minor league) players
Minot Mallards players
Monessen Reds players
Newark Bears (IL) players
Peoria Reds players
Rochester Red Wings players
Syracuse Chiefs players
Toronto Maple Leafs (International League) players
Waterloo Reds players